Clymer repair manuals are repair manuals that often focus on power sport vehicles such as motorcycles, all-terrain vehicles, personal water craft, and snowmobiles. Clymer also has several books dedicated to small engines and "outdoor power equipment" such as leaf blowers, chainsaws and other lawn and garden power equipment.

Clymer repair manuals are named after their creator Floyd Clymer, who is described in the Motorcycle Hall of Fame as a "pioneer in the sport of motorcycling", being a racer and race promoter, a magazine publisher, an author and a motorcycle manufacturer, dealer and distributor.

Clymer repair manuals are categorized as an aftermarket product or non-OEM. Unlike OEM manuals, Clymer repair manuals are written for the do it yourself as well as the professional and experienced mechanic. OEM manuals are often designed for a professional technician, who often has at their disposal an array of specialized tools, equipment and knowledge.

In 2013, Haynes Publishing Group acquired Clymer repair manuals from Penton Media.

Manufacturers covered

Clymer has over three hundred repair manuals that cover thousands of models.

BMW
Harley Davidson
Honda
Suzuki
Yamaha
Kawasaki
Arctic Cat
Polaris
Ski-Doo
Sea-Doo
Evinrude/Johnson

Chrysler outboard engines, 1966-1984
Indmar/GM V-8 Inboard engines, 1983-2003
Tohatsu
Volvo Penta
Force
Mercury/Mercruiser
Outboard Marine
Allis-Chalmers
Case
Cockshutt

Deutz-Allis
New Holland
International Harvester
John Deere
Kubota
Massey Ferguson
Minneapolis-Moline
Mitsubishi
Oliver
White
Yanmar

See also
 Chilton Publishing Company
 Haynes Manuals

References

External links
Clymer.com

Motorcycle technology
Motorcycle writing
Technical communication
Automotive handbooks and manuals